Maniza Naqvi (born 1960) is a writer from Lahore, Pakistan.

Born in Lahore, Naqvi spent her early life in Karachi, Pakistan.

In 2014, her book, I'll Find My Way, was published.

In February 2022, her novel, The Inn, was reviewed by a Pakistani newspaper, DAWN.

Bibliography
 Naqvi, Maniza (1998). Mass Transit, Oxford University Press.
 Naqvi, Maniza (2000). On Air, Oxford University Press.
 Naqvi, Maniza (2004). Stay with Me, Tara Press.
 Naqvi, Maniza (2005). And the World Changed, Oxford University Press.

References

Living people
1960 births
21st-century Pakistani novelists
Pakistani women novelists
Writers from Lahore